Monika Krauze (born 11 April 1984) is a former professional tennis player from the Poland. On 16 July 2007, she reached her highest WTA singles ranking of 716.

Tennis career
She has won 2 doubles titles on the ITF Women's Circuit.Her only WTA Tour main draw appearance came at the 2003 Idea Prokom Open where she partnered Marta Domachowska in the doubles event. But First Round lost french duo Stéphanie Cohen-Aloro and Caroline Dhenin.

References

External links
 
 

1984 births
Living people
Polish female tennis players
Place of birth missing (living people)